Rye Harbor State Park is a public recreation area located on the Atlantic Ocean in the town of Rye, New Hampshire. The portion of the state park located on the peninsula known as Ragged Neck offers scenic views of the ocean, the Isles of Shoals, and the town harbor. Activities include saltwater fishing and picnicking. Amenities include benches, picnic tables, pavilion, and restrooms.

The park includes the 1614 Monument, an obelisk dedicated in 2014 to Captain John Smith, who explored the coast of New England in 1614. Also in the park is New Hampshire Historical Marker No. 18, which provides information about the Isles of Shoals.

References

External links

Rye Harbor State Park New Hampshire Department of Natural and Cultural Resources

State parks of New Hampshire
Parks in Rockingham County, New Hampshire
Rye, New Hampshire
Protected areas established in 1936
1936 establishments in New Hampshire